Prabhat Film Company (popularly known as Prabhat Films) was an Indian film production company and film studios founded in 1929 by the noted film director V.Shantaram and his friends.

It was formed in Kolhapur, Maharashtra, India in 1929, towards the end of silent films' era, by the noted film director V. Shantaram, along with V.G. Damle,  Keshav Rao Dhaibar, S. Fatelal and S.V. Kulkarni. The company moved to Pune in 1933, where it established its own studio and produced a total of 45 films in both Marathi and Hindi over 27 years, including are Kunku (Duniya Na Mane in Hindi), Swarajyacha Toran also called Udaykal, based on Shivaji's life, Dharmatma on life of saint Eknath, Sant Tukaram, based on the saint-poet and social reformer, Shejari also called Padosi, on communal harmony, Manoos (a.k.a. Aadmi) about alcoholism and Amar Jyoti about woman's emancipation. While several companies such as, Imperial Film Company, Krishna Cinetone, East India Film Company, Madan Theatre, Ranjit, Wadia Movietone were very active during the advent of Talkie films in India, Prabhat, along with New Theatres of Kolkata, stood out for their excellence and social awareness.

Today, the Film and Television Institute of India Pune, at Law College Road, is situated in its former premises, and houses the 'Prabhat Museum' which displays artefacts, original contracts and partnership deeds of Prabhat Film Company, along with costumes, properties, equipment, posters and stills.

The University of Chicago Library has a collection of 27 films produced by the Prabhat Film Company between 1932 and 1949

History
Baburao Painter's Maharashtra Film Company, based in Kolhapur, had made a name for itself with its silent films in early 1920s. Close friends Vishnupant G Damle and Fateh Lal (Damle Mama and Saheb Mama) were very good artists and held posts with senior responsibility at the company.

Baburao Pendharkar became the de facto head of operations because of Baburao Painter's distaste for financial matters. Pendharkar's cousin Shantaram Vanakudre (V. Shantaram) joined the company and became Baburao Painter's right-hand man.

In 1927–1928, the senior personnel became dissatisfied by Baburao Painter's increasingly lukewarm and erratic behaviour. Damle and Fateh Lal were thinking of starting their own company, as were V. Shantaram and  Keshav Rao Dhaibar. The four of them got together, and with Sitaram Kulkarni, well-established jeweller in Kolhapur as their fifth partner and financier, started a new company on 1 June 1929, with an initial investment amount of Rs 15,000. Baburao Pendharkar suggested the name Prabhat (meaning "Dawn"), and the other partners liked it.

Prabhat soon made a name for itself with silent films and produced six films, most of them directed by the tireless V. Shantaram. When India entered the era of talkies with Alam Ara in March 1931, Shantaram predicted that it was a transient phase, and the silent films were the real artistic area. But soon the company realized its mistake, and joined the talkie era with Ayodhyecha Raja (The King of Ayodhya) in Marathi (1932), also starring Durga Khote, which was the first film of Marathi Cinema, and later made under the name Ayodhya Ka Raja in Hindi. The film is based on Raja Harishchandra's story. In 1930s when most of silent movies companies had closed down, Prabhat joined the ranks of "big three" of Indian cinema, which included New Theatres of Calcutta and Bombay Talkies of Mumbai 

In September 1933, the company moved to Pune because of its proximity to Mumbai and all the five founder moved with their families, and the doors of the studio finally opened in Pune in 1934. Then followed a golden era of 8–10 years during which the company made some landmark films: Sairandhri (1933), India's first colour film, processed and printed in Germany; Amrit Manthan (1934), Sant Tukaram (1936), Kunku (or Duniya Na Mane in Hindi) in 1937, Manoos (or Aadmi in Hindi) (1939), Shejari (or Padosi) in 1941. The biopic, title Sant Tukaram,  in 1936, made by V. Damle and S. Fattelal of Prabhat Film Company and starring Vishnupant Pagnis as the lead, and released on 12 December 1936 at Central Cinema in Mumbai. The film was not only a big hit but also had won an award at the fifth Venice International Film Festival in 1937, and still remains a part of film appreciation courses.

After Shantaram split away in 1942 to form his own "Rajkamal Kalamandir" studios, and Damle Mama fell ill, the company encountered hard times. People associated with the studio, such as G. Kamble a noted painter, were lured away by Shantaram. Its last major film was Ram Shastri in 1944. Noted director, Guru Dutt started his career as a choreographer, under a three-year contract with the Prabhat Film Company in Pune in 1944. The company was closed in the early 1950s and property auctioned away in 1952. The company formally closed on 13 October 1953.

Major figures associated with Prabhat are composers Govindrao Tembe, Dinkar D. Patil, Keshavrao Bhole, Master Krishnarao, Vasant Desai; actresses Durga Khote, Shanta Apte, Shanta Hublikar, Vasanti, Jayashree Kamulkar; actors Bal Gandharva, Keshavrao Date, Shahu Modak. Other Marathi film companies of note in 1930s include Saraswati Movietone, Shalini Movietone, Hans Pictures. Major film directors : Bhalji (Bhal G) Pendharkar, Master Vinayak. Major music directors : Annasaheb Mainkar, Dhamman Khan, Dada Chandekar.

A number of notable Hindi film personalities were also associated with Prabhat Films, including Guru Dutt, Dev Anand and Rehman.

Legacy

 The Pune premises of Prabhat Studios are today a declared heritage site.
 The Film and Television Institute of India (FTII) today occupies the Pune premises of Prabhat Studio in 1960. Students of FTII continue to use the studio premises.
The road starting from Deccan Corner and ending at Law College Road in Pune is named 'Prabhat Road' because of the location of Prabhat Studios.

Later, Anantrao Damle, V G Damle's son, bought back the company's film prints from Mudaliyar of Chennai, who said he was happy to return to Maharashtra its treasures. Damle's sons have followed up his good work and brought out some of Prabhat's vintage films on VCDs, and songs from several Prabhat Films on audio CDs. However, in January 2003, most of the original nitrates of the films, stored at the FTII cold-storage were destroyed in a fire while waiting to be transferred  to National Film Archives storage.

The  75th anniversary of Prabhat Films was celebrated in Pune, in June 2004. It included an exhibition of rare photographs and screening of the documentary film, It’s Prabhat!.

Filmography
Silent Films
 Gopal Krishna (1929)
 Khooni Khanjar (1930)
 Rani Saheba (1930)
 Udaykal (1930)
 Chandrasena (1931)
 Zulum (1931)

Talkies
 Ayodhyecha Raja (1932)
 Maya Machhindra (1932)
 Agnikankan: Branded Oath(1932)
 Sinhagad (1933)
 Sairandhri (1933)
 Amrit Manthan (1934)
 Dharmatma (1935)
 Chandrasena (1935)
 Amar Jyoti (1936)
 Sant Tukaram (1936)
 Rajput Ramani (1936)
 Kunku (1937)
 Duniya Na Mane (1937)
 Mera Ladka (1938)
 Gopal Krishna (1938)
 Manoos (1939)
 Aadmi (1939)
 Sant Dnyaneshwar (1940)
 Beyond the Horizon
 Padosi (1941)
 Das Baje (1942) also called 10 O'Clock
 Ramshastri (1944)
 Chand (1944)
 Aparadhi (1949)
 Hum Ek Hain (1946 film - Debut film of Dev Anand)
 Aage Badho (1946)(starring Dev Anand)

References

 V. Shantaram, biography Upperstall.com

External links
 
 Prabhat Films at Internet Movie Database

Indian film studios
Film production companies of Maharashtra
1929 establishments in India
1953 disestablishments in India
Marathi cinema
Mass media companies established in 1929
Mass media companies disestablished in 1953
Defunct companies of India
Organisations based in Pune